DG Arena (previously: Stari Ribnjak Stadium) is a football stadium in Donja Gorica suburb, Podgorica, Montenegro. It is situated on the Morača riverbank. It is used for football matches and is the home ground of FK Podgorica and OFK Mladost DG.

History
Stari Ribnjak Stadium was built in 1970, when the old club OFK Mladost Lješkopolje was founded. During 2015 started the project of stadium renovation and building sports' complex on the same place. The first stadium, with artificial turf, floodlights and capacity of 1,000 seats was opened on 21 May 2016.
Two years after that, DG Arena was built. With 4,300 seats, facilities as additional ground and others, it meets the criteria for First League matches. The name of the stadium is an acronym - DG are the initials of the Donja Gorica suburb.
Today, FK Podgorica is playing their Montenegrin First League matches on DG Arena, while another permanent user of the stadium is a lower-ranks member OFK Mladost DG.

Pitch and conditions
The pitch measures 105 x 65 meters.
The stadium have two stands with overall capacity of 4,000 seats. Except that, there will be three additional fields - one with artificial turf, which already exists, and two with natural grass.

See also
 FK Podgorica
 OFK Mladost Donja Gorica
 Podgorica

References 

Football venues in Montenegro
Football in Montenegro
Sport in Podgorica
Buildings and structures in Podgorica